Rose Peak is a peak, 655 m, lying nearly 2 nautical miles (3.7 km) southwest of Rea Peak and 3 nautical miles (6 km) northeast of Ternyck Needle in the central part of King George Island, in the South Shetland Islands.
 

Mountains of King George Island (South Shetland Islands)